AMC Networks International is the division of AMC Networks that operates outside the United States. AMC Networks commissions and distributes TV channels, content and video services. The division's operating companies and business units currently own and operate in joint venture a total of 68 branded TV channels and run a suite of digital, on demand and broadband services in Europe. In aggregate, its channels and feeds reach 382 million homes. AMC Networks International also provide a set of advanced digital services, such as ad sales and broadcast solutions to international channel operators.

The company was originally named Chellomedia and was part of Liberty Global. In 2013, it was sold to AMC Networks (a former subsidiary of Cablevision), and was renamed AMC Networks International.

History
On July 31, 2012, Chellomedia purchased MGM Networks, Inc. from MGM while MGM retaining its United States, Canada, United Kingdom, Germany and joint ventures in Brazil and Australia. Chellomedia has licensed the MGM brand and content to continue on the purchased MGM channels.

On May 21, 2013, it was announced that Liberty Global had put Chellomedia up for sale. Liberty agreed on October 28 to sell Chellomedia to AMC Networks for $1.035B, except for its Benelux unit. The purchase was completed on February 2, 2014.

On July 8, 2014, Chellomedia was renamed AMC Networks International. In November, AMC Networks renamed the European MGM Channel to AMC.

Business units

AMC Networks International runs its businesses through four business units:

AMC Networks International UK (EMEA)
AMC Networks International Central Europe
AMC Networks International Latin America
AMC Networks International Southern Europe

Current channels
 AMC (African and Middle Eastern TV channel)
 AMC (European TV channel)
 AMC (Latin America) 
 AMC Break (Spain & Portugal)
 AMC Crime (Spain & Portugal)
 Biggs (co-owned with NOS)
 Blast
 Blaze (co-owned with A+E Networks UK)
 Canal Cocina
 History (European TV channel) (co-owned with A+E Networks UK)
 Canal Hollywood (co-owned with NOS)
 Canal Panda Portugal (co-owned with NOS)
 CBS-branded channels (co-owned with Paramount International Networks)
 RealityXtra
 HorrorXtra
 CBS Europa
 CBS Reality
 CBS Justice (Africa)
 Crime & Investigation (co-owned with A+E Networks UK)
 Dark
 Decasa
 El Gourmet
 Europa Europa
 Extreme Sports Channel
 Enfamilia
 Film & Arts
 Film Café
 Film Mania
 JimJam
 Kids TV Russia
 Legend (co-owned with Paramount International Networks)
 Más Chic
 Minimax
 Odisea/Odisseia
 Selekt
 ShortsTV (co-owned with Shorts International)
 Sol Música
 Somos
 Sport 1
 Sport 2
 Sport M
 Spektrum TV
 Spektrum Home
 SundanceTV Spain
 SundanceTV Poland
 TV Paprika
 XTRM
 Zoomoo Asia-Pacific and Latin America (co-owned with Beach House Kids, NHNZ and Rock Entertainment Holdings)
 Outdoor Channel Asia-Pacific and EMEA (joint venture with Kroenke Sports & Entertainment and Rock Entertainment Holdings)

Former channels
 AMC (Asian TV channel)
 C8
 CBS Drama (Poland)
 CBS Action
 CBS Justice (UK)
 Canal Panda (Spain)
 Horror Channel
 Eva
 Eva+
 MOV
 Megamax
 OBN
 SundanceTV Africa
 SundanceTV France
 SundanceTV Middle East
 SundanceTV Latinoamérica

Logos

References

External links

AMC Networks International UK
AMC Networks International Iberia
DMC
Atmedia

 
Pan-European media companies
1998 establishments in New York (state)
Companies based in New York (state)